Émile Barrière (1902-1936) was an early twentieth-century French aviator, who played a major role in the early development commercial aviation in South America, rising to be director of Air France's South American network at the age of thirty-one.

Disappearance
In February 1936, Barrière was a passenger on an Air France Latécoère 301 Ville de Buenos Aires which disappeared en route from Natal, Brazil to Dakar, French West Africa. After a radio message from the vicinity of Saint Peter and Saint Paul Archipelago reporting that the flying boat was flying in rain at an altitude of 300m, nothing more was ever heard of the aircraft.

See also 
List of people who disappeared mysteriously at sea

References

1902 births
1930s missing person cases
1936 deaths
French aviators
Missing aviators
Recipients of the Legion of Honour
Victims of aviation accidents or incidents in international waters